Agustín Nicolás Pérez (born 22 November 1991) is an Argentine professional footballer who plays as a goalkeeper.

Career
Platense were Pérez's first club. He appeared twenty-seven times for the club across three seasons, including for his senior bow on 18 August 2012 versus Chacarita Juniors in Primera B Metropolitana. Pérez completed a move to fellow tier three team Fénix in January 2015. Forty-six appearances occurred across three seasons. Pérez spent the entirety of 2017–18 with UAI Urquiza but didn't feature competitively. On 30 June 2018, Comunicaciones signed Pérez. He made his first appearances for them in December, participating in every minute of games against Sacachispas, Deportivo Español and Tristán Suárez.

July 2019 saw Pérez join third tier JJ Urquiza, though he'd leave six months later without featuring. In January 2020, Pérez penned terms with Deportivo Armenio.

Career statistics
.

References

External links

1991 births
Living people
Sportspeople from Córdoba Province, Argentina
Argentine footballers
Association football goalkeepers
Primera B Metropolitana players
Club Atlético Platense footballers
Club Atlético Fénix players
UAI Urquiza players
Club Comunicaciones footballers
Asociación Social y Deportiva Justo José de Urquiza players
Deportivo Armenio footballers